Alajuelita is a district of the Alajuelita canton, in the San José province of Costa Rica.

Geography 
Alajuelita has an area of  km² and an elevation of  metres.

Demographics 

For the 2011 census, Alajuelita had a population of  inhabitants.

Transportation

Road transportation 
The district is covered by the following road routes:
 National Route 105
 National Route 110

Culture 
The Santuario Nacional Santo Cristo de Esquipulas is located in this district.

References 

Districts of San José Province
Populated places in San José Province